John Kiffmeyer (born July 11, 1969), known professionally as Al Sobrante, is an American cinematographer and retired musician and songwriter. He is best known as the first drummer for the punk rock band Green Day. His stage name is a reference to his hometown, El Sobrante.

Biography
John Kiffmeyer was born in El Sobrante, California on July 11, 1969. His first exposure in the punk scene was as the drummer of the band Isocracy. The group was popular in the East Bay, and mainstays at the club 924 Gilman Street. He chose his stage name Al Sobrante for an evident pun on his birthplace. 

Kiffmeyer is most well known for his time in Green Day; after Isocracy broke up, he joined Mike Dirnt and Billie Joe Armstrong in 1987 to replace original drummer Raj Punjabi and join Sweet Children, which was later renamed Green Day. Because of his experience and knowledge of the underground community, Kiffmeyer was able to get the young band on its feet by placing calls to friends, among them prominent figure of the East Bay Larry Livermore. The first few performances took place at Contra Costa College, where Kiffmeyer was a journalism student. On the strength of an early performance, Livermore vowed to release a Green Day record on his Lookout! Records. The group's first full-length effort, 1990 album 39/Smooth, would feature a Kiffmeyer original, "I Was There", which documented the band at that place in time. Being a fan of Ozzy Osbourne, he inspired the mini-covers of some famous songs, such as "I Don't Know" by Osbourne and "Sweet Home Alabama" by Lynyrd Skynyrd during the bridge of "Disappearing Boy", a practice that is still carried out today.

In 1990, he attended college at Humboldt State University in Arcata, California. While Kiffmeyer was attending college, Green Day members Billie Joe Armstrong and Mike Dirnt accepted drummer Tré Cool into the band, which Kiffmeyer "graciously accepted". In 1991, he worked as executive producer for the Green Day album Kerplunk, released that year. Kiffmeyer later joined the band The Ne'er Do Wells, leaving abruptly in 1994. Following a stint with punk band The Ritalins, he became manager of The Shruggs until their split. In 1998 he was the executive producer of The Great Lost Trouble Makers Album by The Troublemakers, a garage rock band from Sacramento, California. 

He now lives in San Francisco, California and is married to experimental filmmaker and San Francisco State University professor Greta Snider. He works as a Director of Photography, specializing in green screen and producing mainly commercial work.

On April 16, 2015, Kiffmeyer joined Billie Joe Armstrong and Mike Dirnt on stage during a Green Day concert at The House of Blues in Cleveland, Ohio, where the trio performed as Sweet Children and played songs that they had not performed since the 1990s, including "Sweet Children", "Green Day", "I Was There", "Don't Leave Me" and "Dry Ice".

Discography

With Isocracy
 El Sob Demo (1987)
 Bedtime For Isocracy (1988)

With Green Day

Studio albums
 39/Smooth (1990)

Other releases
 1,000 Hours (EP, 1989)
 Slappy (EP, 1990)
 Sweet Children (EP, 1990)
 1,039/Smoothed Out Slappy Hours (1991)

With The Ne'er Do Wells
 Hello, It Is I, Thee Intolerable Bastard, Child Genius (1993)

Other appearances
 Turn It Around! (1987 compilation album) ("Confederate Flags")
 The Big One (1991 compilation album) ("I Want To Be Alone")

Production discography
 Green Day - Kerplunk (1991) as Executive Producer
 Screeching Weasel - My Brain Hurts (1991)
 The Trouble Makers - The Great Lost Trouble Makers Album (1998)

References

1969 births
American punk rock drummers
American male drummers
Record producers from California
Green Day members
Living people
American people of German descent
Musicians from the San Francisco Bay Area
Contra Costa College alumni
California State Polytechnic University, Humboldt alumni
20th-century American drummers
People from El Sobrante, Contra Costa County, California
American cinematographers

hu:Al Sobrante